Sedro-Woolley is a city in Skagit County, Washington, United States. It is part of the Mount Vernon–Anacortes, Washington Metropolitan Statistical Area and had a population of 12,421 at the 2020 census. The city is home to North Cascades National Park.

History

Four British bachelors, led by David Batey, homesteaded the area in 1878, the time logjam obstructions were cleared downriver at the site of Mount Vernon. In 1884–85, Batey built a store and home for the Mortimer Cook family from Santa Barbara, California where Cook had been mayor for two terms. Cook intended to name his new Pacific Northwest town Bug due to the number of mosquitos present, but his wife protested along with a handful of other local wives. Cook was already the namesake for the town Cook's Ferry on the Thompson River in British Columbia. With "Bug" being so unpopular, Cook derived a town name from Spanish; knowing "cedro" was the word for cedar, he replaced one letter to make the name unique, settling on "Sedro".

Sedro, on the northern banks of the Skagit River, proved susceptible to floods. The Fairhaven and Southern Railroad arrived in Sedro on Christmas Eve 1889, in time for Bennett to receive a performance bonus from the towns at both ends, and a month after Washington became the 42nd state in the Union.

Within months, two more railroads crossed the F&S roadbed a half mile north of new Sedro, forming a triangle where 11 trains eventually arrived daily. Railroad developer Philip A. Woolley moved his family from Elgin, Illinois, to Sedro in December 1899 and bought land around the triangle. He built the Skagit River Lumber & Shingle Mill next to where the railroads crossed and he started his namesake company town there that was based on sales of railroad ties to the three rail companies, including the Seattle and Northern Railway (forerunner of the Great Northern Railway) and the Northern Pacific Railroad.

Meanwhile, a fourth town rose nearby when the F&S laid rails on a "wye" that led northeast from Sedro about four and a half miles to coal mines. Bennett bought the mines, along with Montana mining financier Charles X. Larrabee, and they soon sold their interests to James J. Hill, owner of the Great Northern. The resulting ore soon turned out to be more suitable for coking coal and a town began there named Cokedale. Cokedale faded in importance when the mine declined and the other towns all merged on December 19, 1898, as Sedro-Woolley.

On May 15, 1922, a large circus elephant known as Tusko escaped from the Al G. Barnes Circus, which was making one of its stops in Sedro-Woolley, at that time. The elephant stomped his way through the little logging town and into local history, demolishing fences, knocking over laundry lines and trees, telephone poles, and a Model T.

After logging and coal-mining declined, the major employers and industries became the nearby Northern State Hospital (a mental-health facility) and Skagit Steel & Iron Works, which rose from the back room of a local hardware store to become a major supplier of implements and parts for logging and railroad customers. The firm manufactured machines and parts for the war effort in World War II and artillery shells, starting in 1953. By 1990, the company was gone and the hospital was closed but new industry, including robotics and aerospace, is developing north of town and on the campus of the old hospital.

Government
The City of Sedro-Woolley is a non-charter code city that operates under a Mayor-Council form of government with seven councilmembers. Six councilmembers are elected by wards and one is elected at-large. Each councilmember serves a four-year term. The mayor is elected at-large every four years and is responsible for the executive functions of the city. The mayor appoints a city supervisor, subject to confirmation by the city council, who is responsible for the day-to-day operations of the city and oversees the department directors. The municipal judge is appointed by the mayor, subject to confirmation of the city council, and operates independently of the other branches of government.

Sedro-Woolley is a full-service city with its own police department, fire department, wastewater treatment plan, solid waste operation, storm water division, street department, parks department and administration. The city maintains a large number of public parks and open spaces such as Hammer Heritage Square in downtown Sedro-Woolley. Riverfront Park situated on the north bank of the Skagit River is the signature park. Every year on the 4th of July the city celebrates with a festive carnival, and hosts the Loggerodeo parade.

Education

The Sedro-Woolley School District operates public schools in the city as well as nearby communities, including Big Lake and Clear Lake. The district has one high school (Sedro-Woolley High School), one middle school, seven elementary schools, and several alternative schooling programs. This includes a Job Corps center, known as Cascades,.

Culture
Sedro-Woolley is the home of Loggerodeo, a celebration staged annually since the mid-1930s close to the Fourth of July. The annual event is well known in Western Washington and one of the oldest rural summer celebrations in the state with many of the events dating back more than 100 years. Loggerodeo features a carnival, foot-race, log drive, old-time logging show, championship rodeo, children's parade, the annual Fourth of July parade, and an invitation-only chainsaw carving competition. Favorite chainsaw carved log creations from the carving competitions of past years line the downtown Sedro-Woolley area. It is also home to the legendary Hal's Drive-In, an institution in the town for decades.

Geography

Climate
Sedro-Woolley has a warm-summer Mediterranean climate (Csb) according to the Köppen climate classification system, but nearly qualifies as having an Oceanic climate (Cfb) due to its less pronounced drying trend in summer, as compared with elsewhere in western Washington.

Demographics

2010 census
As of the census of 2010, there were 10,540 people, 3,995 households, and 2,609 families residing in the city. The racial makeup of the city was 86.1% White, 0.3% African American, 1.9% Native American, 1.4% Asian, 6.8% from other races, and 3.3% from two or more races. Hispanic or Latino of any race were 14.0% of the population.

There were 3,995 households, of which 36.9% had children under the age of 18 living with them, 43.9% were married couples living together, 14.9% had a female householder with no husband present, 6.5% had a male householder with no wife present, and 34.7% were non-families. 27.0% of all households were made up of individuals, and 10.2% had someone living alone who was 65 years of age or older. The average household size was 2.59 and the average family size was 3.12.

The median age in the city was 33.7 years. 27.3% of residents were under the age of 18; 9% were between the ages of 18 and 24; 28.2% were from 25 to 44; 22.7% were from 45 to 64; and 12.7% were 65 years of age or older. The gender makeup of the city was 48.3% male and 51.7% female.

2000 census
As of the census of 2000, there were 8,658 people, 3,205 households, and 2,176 families residing in the city. The racial makeup of the city was 91.97% White, 0.25% African American, 1.59% Native American, 0.81% Asian, 0.13% Pacific Islander, 3.25% from other races, and 2.00% from two or more races. Hispanic or Latino of any race were 7.23% of the population.

There were 3,205 households, out of which 37.5% had children under the age of 18 living with them, 49.8% were married couples living together, 13.5% had a female householder with no husband present, and 32.1% were non-families. 25.9% of all households were made up of individuals, and 12.6% had someone living alone who was 65 years of age or older. The average household size was 2.62 and the average family size was 3.14.

In the city, the age distribution of the population shows 28.8% under the age of 18, 9.2% from 18 to 24, 29.3% from 25 to 44, 18.4% from 45 to 64, and 14.3% who were 65 years of age or older. The median age was 33 years. For every 100 females, there were 90.3 males. For every 100 females age 18 and over, there were 84.8 males.

The median income for a household in the city was $37,914, and the median income for a family was $40,918. Males had a median income of $35,215 versus $23,636 for females. The per capita income for the city was $16,517. About 10.7% of families and 11.3% of the population were below the poverty line, including 12.9% of those under age 18 and 16.1% of those age 65 or over.

See also

 List of cities and towns in Washington

References

External links

 
 Chamber website
 Skagit River Journal: History of Sedro-Woolley and Skagit County
 Loggerodeo website
 The Sedro-Woolley Museum
 Sedro-Woolley Means Business Official Website
 Live Video from the Sedro-Woolley Skate Park

Cities in Washington (state)
Cities in Skagit County, Washington
Populated places established in 1898
1898 establishments in Washington (state)